NGC 152 is an open cluster in the constellation Tucana. It was discovered by John Herschel on September 20, 1835. It is located within the Small Magellanic Cloud.

NGC 152 is about 1.40 billion years old. All else equal, older star clusters have a lower luminosity for the same mass; that is, their mass-to-luminosity ratios are higher.

See also
List of NGC objects (1–1000)
List of stars in Tucana

References

External links

0152
Open clusters
Tucana (constellation)
Astronomical objects discovered in 1835
Small Magellanic Cloud